Telmatobius latirostris is a species of frog in the family Telmatobiidae.
It is endemic to Peru.
Its natural habitats are rivers, urban areas, and irrigated land.
It is threatened by habitat loss.

References

latirostris
Amphibians of Peru
Endemic fauna of Peru
Amphibians of the Andes
Taxonomy articles created by Polbot
Amphibians described in 1951